Bălți is a city in Moldova. It is the second largest city in terms of population, area and economic importance, after Chișinău. The city is one of the five Moldovan municipalities. Sometimes also called "the northern capital", it is a major industrial, cultural and commercial centre and transportation hub in the north of the country.

Name
The word "bălți" (pl. of Romanian sing. "baltă") in direct translation means "puddle". It is believed that the city had been named thus because it was founded on a hill dominating the wetland formed where the creek Răuțel ("Little Răut") falls into the river Răut.

History and symbols

Coat of arms

The current coat of arms and flag of Bălți, elaborated by Silviu Tabac from the Moldovan State Commission for Heraldry, have been adopted by the Municipal Council in April 2006.

A shield, with alternating six silvery strips (symbolizing water), and six blue strips (symbolizing earth) form the background (symbolizing the name of the city). The central element of the shield is an archer in red clothes, in the military outfit (yellow) of Stephen III of Moldavia (Romanian: Ștefan cel Mare) times (15th century). The archer represents the medieval military recruitment, formed by local free peasants.

On top of the shield there is a silver crown in the shape of fortress wall, with seven towers. (The crown represents the fact that the locality is a city. Apart from Bălți, only the capital Chișinău, and Tiraspol are allowed to have seven towers, while other cities must limit this number to three or five.) The shield is supported by two rearing silver horses (the white horse is the traditional symbol of the region, which was part of Iași County before 1812). Under the shield there is a ribbon with the Latin inscription CEDANT ARMA TOGAE, meaning let arms yield to the toga.

In the Middle Ages, the archer was featured on the coats of arms of the region. In the 19th century, the city and district coats of arms also featured a horse head. In the early 20th century, a shield representing an archer, standing on a hill, the sun, and three bullrush sticks (elements quite sufficient to identify the place where Bălți is situated in the landscape of the north of Moldova) formed the coat of arms of the Bălți county, while these and horse elements - the coat of arms of the city proper.

Flag
The city's flag is composed of two horizontal strips: a blue one on the bottom, and a silver one on top. The shield and archer elements from the coat of arms are also present in the centre of the flag.

Geography
Bălți is situated on the tops and slopes of three hills and in two small valleys. The land in the north of Moldova is very fertile, mostly consisting of black earth or chernozem. Several extraction sites for raw materials used in the construction industry are also found in the vicinity of Bălți. The creeks Răuțel, Copăceanca, and Flămândă cross the territory of the municipality, and flow into the river Răut. Also, several lakes are situated in Bălți: City Lake, Komsolskoe Lake, Hunters and Fishermen Lake, Strâmba Lake.

Of these, an important portion is agriculturally cultivated.

Neighbourhoods
The city itself is located on portions of three hills. The river Răut separates one of the hills to the north-east, the slopes of this hill are occupied by the neighbourhood Slobozia. Răut's affluent Răuțel separates another hill in the south, the slopes of which are the Podul Chișinăului. The largest of the three hills dominates the valleys of the creek and river, and contains the city centre and the old town, and the neighbourhoods Pământeni, Dacia, 6th district, 8th district, the city's main industrial area, and [[Molodova neighborhood. The top of this hill is occupied by the medical facilities district. Bălții Noi neighborhood is situated in the valley of the Răuțel creek.

A Soroca neighborhood, 10th district, 9th district, the area of the former Bălți concentration camp, and the Bălți City Airport are situated in the valley of the Răut river.

The names of city neighborhoods reflect different historic influences, such as names of 19th century suburbs that are nowadays within city limits: Pământeni, Slobozia, Molodova, Podul Chișinăului, Bălții Noi; others are known by their Soviet-era names: 6th district, 8th district, 9th district. A neighbourhood in the northern part of the city is called Dacia, and is colloquially sometimes referred to as BAM. A district in the eastern part is known as 10th district.

Climate
Bălți has a warm-summer humid continental climate (Köppen climate classification Dfb). Winds are generally from the north-east or the north-west at about 2–5 m/s.

Seismology
The city is situated in the 7th zone of seismic activity, with a well-felt earthquake (generally without any serious structural damage to the city's buildings) occurring every 35 years on average.

Cityscape

Architecture
Cultural venues in the city include:
 Vasile Alecsandri National Theatre
 The oldest surviving building, a two-story boyar house, right in the heart of the city centre, dates back to 1609. Though it has been re-constructed and re-modeled many times with total disregard to conservation to the extent that now it simply looks like an odd two-story building.
 Monument of Stephen the Great (2003)
 Others (see down through the text)

Churches:
 Saint Nicolas Church, Bălți (1795). Although Orthodox, the building, financed by Gheorghe Panaiti, has a degree of catholic influence brought in by the architect Antuan Weismann from Galicia.
 Saint Constantine and Elena Cathedral, Bălți (1934), Orthodox, built in neo-Byzantine style. The building, at which official opening the Romanian royal family was present, survived almost without visible effects the harsh treatment during the Soviet era. During this time it was mostly a depot and later turned into the municipal museum.
 Bishopric Palace, Bălți (1924–1932), was the main office of the agricultural enterprise-institute "Selectia", and the surrounding park during the Soviet era.
 Saint Parascheva Church, Bălți (1933), by the bishop Visarion Puiu.
 Archangels Michael and Gabriel Church, Bălți (1912–1933)
 Saint Peter and Paul Church, Bălți (1915–1929)
 Armenian Saint Gregory Church, Bălți (1916)
 Birth of the Blessed Virgin Mary Church (1884)

Culture and contemporary life

Entertainment and performing arts
Theaters:
 Vasile Alecsandri National Theatre
 "Eugène Ionesco" Theatre
 "Licurici" Republican Puppet Theatre
 "B.P. Hajdeu" Republican Drama-Muzical Theatre
 "Mihai Eminescu" National Theatre
 "Luceafarul" Republican Theatre
 Municipal Theatre "Satiricus I.L. Caragiale"

Museums and art galleries:
 "Exhibition of the Union of painters "Constantin Brâncuși"
 Artum Art Gallery

Media
 Deca-press, the oldest independent press agency in the north of the country.
 Spros i Predlojenie, a major Russian language daily newspaper serving northern Moldova.
 Gazeta.MD the News agency founded in December 2007.
 Golos Bălți the city newspaper, founded in 1947.
 Makler the advertising newspaper from Moldova and Ukraine.
 Belicy-sity  information and entertaining portal Belicy-sity.

Radio stations 
List of FM radio stations from Bălți as of 4 July 2009.
 90.0-«Serebriannii dojdi»
 90.5-«Prime FM»
 92.00-«Retro FM»
 101.0-«Vocea Basarabiei»
 101.5-«City radio»
 102.1-«Radio ALLA»
 102.9-«BBC»
 103.5-«Vzrosloe radio Shanson»
 103.9-«Fresh FM»
 104.9-«Radio Moldova»
 105.6-«Megapolis Fm»
 106.2-«Russcoe Radio»
 107.2-«NOROC»
 107.6-«Hit FM»

Civil society
Bălți is a source of civil society development both locally and nationwide. Bălți is home to numerous independent and apolitical organisations such as Second Breath, one of the Moldovan NGOs for care of socially vulnerable persons, Tinerii pentru Dreptul la Viață ("Youth for the right to live"), a youth organisation.

Sports
 7 sport schools in Bălți offer programmes in the following sports: Orienteering, volleyball, handgun shooting sports, equestrianism, basketball, handball, weightlifting, chess, swimming, canoeing, football, athletics, tourism.
 Municipal Stadium "Olimpia Bălți Stadium" (home of FC Olimpia Bălți)
 Olympic Swimming Pool "Central"
 Olympic Swimming Pool "Volna" (open air)
 FC Olimpia Bălți is a football club based in the city and plays in Moldova's top league, the Moldovan National Division

Economy

Historically Bălți was known for producing tobacco. They also had many vineyards and orchards.

Most of the city's industry centres on food processing, notably in the production of flour, sugar, and wine. Manufacturing of furniture and agricultural machinery also plays an important role in Bălți's economy.

The service sector has developed after 1989 to cover the basic needs of the population.

Manufacturing
This city is an important economic centre, with manufacturing playing an important role. Besides traditional for Moldova wine making, sugar, meat processing, flour milling, oil production, and light industry in general, Bălți is the centre for manufacturing of agricultural machinery, of various construction materials, fur, textile, chemical and furniture industries. A mammoth Soviet-type conglomerate 8,000-worker factory (called "Lenin" before 1989 and "Răut" afterwards) produced a large variety of machine building products for consumer or industry use, from irons and telephone sets to sonar equipment for Soviet military submarines. However, due to swift changes in the economic environment after the breakdown of the Soviet planned economy system, the manufacturing base of the city has severely suffered. Nevertheless, more recently, new economic ties are being created, with collaboration and direct investment mostly from the European Union.

Lisa Dräxlmaier GmbH celebrated the inauguration of its second plant in Moldova. The facility, which will be located in Balti, will produce wiring harnesses.

Shopping
Bălți has several major shopping chain outlets, such as the German Metro Group AG, Ukrainian Fourchette and Moldovan Fidesco.

Numerous shops, can be found in the central (retail), eastern (en gros) and northern (retail) parts of the city. The biggest shopping galleries are located in the centre and in the Dacia district (north) of the city. Souvenir boutiques are mostly found around the central square Vasile Alecsandri. The central market is open from early morning.

A variety of small private stores and supermarkets are available. There are also six public-owned and four private-owned markets. More recently several supermarket chains have opened stores in the city.

Health facilities
The city has a big Republican hospital, another multifunctional municipal hospital, a children's hospital, and a range of other medical facilities (smaller clinics and hospitals, as well as buildings, named poly-clinics, gathering doctors offices).

Demographics
Births (2010): 1573 (10.6 per 1000)
Deaths (2010): 1447 (9.7 per 1000)
Growth rate (2010): 126 (0.9 per 1000)

As per 2014 census preliminary results, 105,000 inhabitants live within the Bălți municipality limits. This represents a 17.7% drop in the number of residents as opposed to the results of the 2004 census.

According to the 2004 Moldovan Census, data submitted by the Department of Statistics and Sociology of the Republic of Moldova, the population of municipality of Bălți was 127,561, of which the population of the city itself was 122,669, and that of the suburban villages of Elizaveta and Sadovoe was of 3,523, respectively 1,369. Of these, 58,418 were men and 69,143 were women.

Ethnic groups, 2014:

Footnote: * There is an ongoing controversy regarding the ethnic identification of Moldovans and Romanians.

The population of Bălți in accordance with available census data.

Religion
At the 2004 census, 90.7% of the population (110,961 people) identified themselves as Christian Orthodox, 2.1% (2,609) as Baptist, 0.8% as Catholic, 0.5% as Seventh-day Adventist, 0.4% as Pentecostal, 0.2% as Methodist, 0.1% as Evangelical, 0.09% as Muslim, 0.06%  as Presbyterian, 0.04% as Old Believers, 0.04% as Reformed, 1.8% (2161 people) as followers of other religions, 0.4% as atheist, and 2.7% (3,304) as non-religious.

Social aspects

The post-independence decrease in the city population is mainly due to the economic and demographic situation of Moldova, which prompted a wave of permanent or temporary emigration.

Remittances from the migrant workers account for 30% of Moldova's GDP, the highest percentage in all of Europe. Often, elderly relatives and children of these workers are left to live in Bălți.

The majority of the population of Bălți is bilingual (Romanian and Russian), but some people only know one of these two languages. Many people in the city also understand and/or speak Ukrainian.

Pre-WWII Jewish Community

"Between the two world wars, the Jewish community of Bălți was a vibrant population of trade, industry and culture, Zionism and Yiddish, political parties and youth movements. Bălți was the second largest populated city in Bessarabia, with the second largest number of Jewish inhabitants after Kishinev, and the economic center of the region. In the official 1930 census, Bălți was listed as having 14,229 Jewish residents, about 60% of its total population.

"Following the Molotov-Ribbentrop Agreement, Bălți was absorbed into the Soviet Union in the summer of 1940, coming under Soviet rule.

"On 22 June 1941, the Germans invaded the USSR. On 9 July, Bălți was occupied by German and Romanian armies, and waves of abuse and murder began. At the end of July, the German units and Gestapo officers left the city in the hands of the Romanians. In September 1941 the last of the Jews of Bălți– some 2,800 people – were expelled to the Mărculești Camp, and the Jewish population of the city ceased to exist. In Mărculești, many members of the community died, and the rest were deported to Transnistria."

Government

Bălți Municipality is a territorial unit of Moldova (one of its 3 municipalities not subordinated to other territorial units; it has had the status of municipality since 1994), containing the city itself, and the villages of Elizaveta and Sadovoe.

The Mayor Office is headed by the Mayor, and administers the local affairs, while the Municipal Council serves as a consultative body with some powers of general policy determination. It is composed of 35 council members elected every four years. As a result of the last regional elections of local public administration held in June 2007, the Communist Party (PCRM) holds 21 mandates, 11 mandates are held by representatives of other parties, and 3 mandates by independents. There are two factions in the Municipal Council: the PCRM faction (21 members) and "Meleag" (Romanian for "Native land") faction (3 independents and 4 representatives of different parties).

The Mayor of the municipality is elected for four years. Vasile Panciuc, PCRM, is the incumbent from 2001 and was re-elected twice: in 2003 during the anticipated elections (as a result of a new reform of the administrative division in Moldova), and in 2007.

Politics
Until recently, voters in the Bălți municipality mainly supported the PCRM. This is explained by the fact that the municipality contains a large Russian-speaking minority (43%) which primarily votes Communist. However, support for the Communists has seen a steady decline in the last three elections.

Elections

|-
!  style="background:#e9e9e9; text-align:center;" colspan=2|Parties and coalitions
!  style="background:#e9e9e9; text-align:right;"|Votes
!  style="background:#e9e9e9; text-align:right;"|%
!  style="background:#e9e9e9; text-align:right;"|+/−
|-
| 
|align=left|Party of Communists of the Republic of Moldova
|align="right"|36,348
|align="right"|56.89
|align="right"|−1.27
|-
| 
|align=left|Liberal Democratic Party of Moldova
|align="right"|11,721
|align="right"|18.35
|align="right"|+5.53
|-
| 
|align=left|Democratic Party of Moldova
|align="right"|8,746
|align="right"|13,69
|align="right"|-1.91
|-
| 
|align=left|Liberal Party
|align="right"|3,147
|align="right"|4.93
|align="right"|−2.71
|-
| 
|align=left|Party Alliance Our Moldova
|align="right"|882
|align="right"|1.38
|align="right"|−1.49
|-
| style="background:gray;"|
|align=left|Other Party
|align="right"|3,057
|align="right"|4.76
|align="right"|+1.85
|-
|  style="text-align:left; background:#e9e9e9;" colspan=2|Total (turnout 58.73%)
|  style="text-align:right; width:30px; background:#e9e9e9;"|64,233
|  style="text-align:right; width:30px; background:#e9e9e9;"|100.00
|  style="text-align:right; width:30px; background:#e9e9e9;"|

Military

The 1st Motorized Infantry Brigade "Moldova" of the Moldovan Land Forces Command (out of a total of 6 brigades – three infantry, one artillery, one airborne and one anti-aircraft) is located in Bălți. A unit of Soviet Tochka-M short-range rockets, each carrying  of conventional explosive, was known to be based in the city. No up to date information is available.

Education

Primary and Secondary Education
There are 13 lyceums and 6 professional education institutions offering the last 3 years of high school education and 2 years post-high school technical education. Also, 14 secondary schools (numbered 2, 3, 4, 6, 7, 9, 10, 12, 14, 15, 16, 19, 21, 23), 7 professional or professional-technical schools (numbered 1 through 7), and 3 boarding schools, including one for visually impaired are located in the city.

Higher education
 The Alecu Russo University of Bălți, the second largest university in Moldova, named after the 19th century Romanian scholar and ethnologist Alecu Russo. The university houses one of the biggest libraries in the South-Eastern Europe. It is a public university.
 The private Dniester Institute of Economy and Law
 The private Moldovan Branch of the non-governmental educational institution "Baltic Institute of Ecology, Politics and Law"
 The private Humanist Contemporary Institute

These schools teach either in Romanian, Russian, Ukrainian, English or are mixed. The latter case was inherited from the Soviet system, which provided for education in Russian and Romanian (Moldovan) languages, where mixed schools were created with the administration being carried out in both languages.

Historical monuments and architecture

 Saint Nicolas Cathedral (1795)
 Church of the Nativity of the Virgin Mary (1884)
 Saint Gregory Armenian Church (1916)
 Saint Constantine and Helen Cathedral (1935)
 Saint Parascheva Church (1934)
 Church of the Holy Apostles Peter and Paul (1929)
 Church of the Holy Archangels Michael and Gabriel (1933)
 Bălți Bishopric (1934)
 Vasile Alecsandri National Theatre
 Matrimonial Palace
 History and Ethnography Museum
 A monument of Stefan the Great (2003)
 Bust of Mihai Eminescu
 Bust of Vasile Alecsandri
 Bust of Taras Shevchenko (2001)
 A monument to soldiers killed in Afghanistan (1999)

Transport

Public transport

Passenger transport in Bălți is handled mainly by the Bălți Trolleybus Authority and Bălți Bus Authority, as well as by private bus, minibus and taxi companies. The total number of passengers transported in Bălți in 2004 was 35.4 million.

There are around 25 minibus lines in Bălți and its agglomeration. The Bălți Bus Authority (B.B.A.) provides regular bus routes only in suburbs. There are also private bus and minibus services, which are not regulated by the B.B.A., provides regular routes in Bălți.

There are 3 trolleybus lines in Bălți, the fourth line being planned to be constructed in future. Most trolleybuses used by the Bălți Trolleybus Authority (B.T.A.) are different modifications of the Soviet ZiU-682, one Czech Škoda-14Tr13/6M, three Belorussian АКСМ–20101, and seven Russian Trans-Alfa 5298.00 (375).

Bălți offers a choice of taxi services, most of which operate for a fixed fee in the inner city. Three taxi companies are branches of Moldovan national companies, two taxi companies are Bălți registered businesses.

Road
Bălți is an important transportation hub of Moldova. The best inter-city transportation is done by coach or van (privately or publicly owned).  of Soviet-style highway (portions in good or fair condition) connect the city to the capital Chișinău. By road one can also reach Ukraine (in about 2 hours) to the north or to the east, and Romania (in about 1 hour) to the south-west by the Sculeni–Sculeni crossing point, which leads to the Romanian city of Iași ( from Bălți), or to the west by the Stânca–Costești crossing.

The Bălți Inter-City Coach Station provides for regular bus connections throughout Moldova, as well as for numerous European and international connections (Eurolines).

Rail
The railway lines are not electrified, and contain only a single track between stations. Since Moldova gained independence, the railway lines became the responsibility of Calea Ferată din Moldova (Railways of Moldova) state company.

There are two railway stations: Bălți-City Station and Bălți-Slobozia Station (the name of a city neighbourhood), which both serve internal and international traffic.

Air
The city also has two operational airports. Large aircraft can land (one 2,200 meter runway), it operates both charter passenger and cargo flights. As of October 2007, it does not operate regular passenger flights.

A second airport, for small aircraft, Bălți City Airport, is located on the Eastern outskirts of the city. It was the most important airport in the surrounding region during World War II, but currently is only used for municipal and regional public services, agriculture, emergency services and pilot training.Now, there are developing an industrial area.

Notable people

 Boris Anisfeld, Russian-American painter and theater designer.
Mihai Volontir, awarded Moldovan actor
 Natalia Barbu, singer, represented Moldova at the 2007 Eurovision musical competition
 Zelik Berditshever, Yiddish folk poet and composer
 Gheorghe Briceag, political prisoner, dissident, and human rights activist with the Helsinki Committee, recipient of the 2004 Homo Homini Award
 Iosif Chișinevschi, communist politician
 Eugenio Coșeriu, philologist, founder of the School of Linguistics at Tübingen University
 Roman Greenberg
 Lia van Leer, founder and director of the International Jerusalem Film Festival
 Marian Lupu, politician, speaker of the Parliament of Moldova since 2005
 Ion Pelivan, lawyer and politician, co-leader of the Moldavian National Party, minister of the exterior of the Moldavian Democratic Republic, killed by NKVD
 Ștefan Pirogan, mayor of Bălți (1923–1934)
 Vadim Pirogan, political prisoner and dissident
 Colea Răutu, Romanian movie star
 Leonid Soybelman, musician
 Nicolae Testemițanu, Moldovan physician, surgeon, hygienist, and politician
 Nicolae Filip, academician
 Vadim Vacarciuc, weight lifter, 1997 World Champion
 Boris Sandler, novelist and editor of Forverts (Yiddish edition of the Jewish Forward, published in New York).
 Isa Kremer, soprano of Russian Jewish descent
 Mikhaïl Faerman, Belgian-Russian classical pianist
 Geta Burlacu, Singer, represented Moldova the 2008 Eurovision with the song: "A Century Of Love".
 Riorita Paterău, politician

Trivia
 The famous Yiddish song Mein Shtetle Belz from 1932, written by Jacob Jacobs (theater) and composed by Alexander Olshanetsky for the play Ghetto Song, makes a reference to the old Jewish city of Bălți. It had been a tribute to the famous singer Isa Kremer, born in Bălți, and who was probably also the first one to perform it.

International relations

Twin towns – sister cities
Bălți is twinned with:

 Arad, Israel
 Białystok, Poland
 Botoșani, Romania
 Chernivtsi, Ukraine
 Comrat, Moldova

 Gyula, Hungary
 İzmir, Turkey
 Jining, China

 Khmelnytskyi, Ukraine
 Lakeland, United States
 Larissa, Greece
 Livny, Russia
 Miercurea Ciuc, Romania
 Mohyliv-Podilskyi, Ukraine
 Narva, Estonia
 Nizhny Novgorod, Russia
 Orsha, Belarus
 Płock, Poland
 Podolsk, Russia
 Polotsk, Belarus
 Pushkin (Saint Petersburg), Russia
 Rechytsa, Belarus
 Smolyan, Bulgaria

 Stryi, Ukraine
 Suceava, Romania
 Vinnytsia, Ukraine
 Vitebsk, Belarus
 Western Administrative Okrug (Moscow), Russia
 Wuzhong, China
 Zapadnoye Degunino District (Moscow), Russia

Consulates
 Consulate-General of Romania, address: 51, Sfântul Nicolae Str.
 Consulate of Ukraine, address: 143, Kiev Str.

Notes and references

Further reading 
 Beltsy/Balti (pp. 354–357) at Miriam Weiner's Routes to Roots Foundation

External links

 
 
 The former Jewish Community of Bălți/Beltsy
 Tourism in Bălți at www.tur.md
The Story of the Jewish Community in Bălți - an online exhibition by Yad Vashem
 Jewish Cemetery in Bălți

 
Municipalities of Moldova
1620 establishments in Europe
Populated places established in the 1420s
Moldova articles needing attention
Beletsky Uyezd
Bălți County (Romania)
Capitals of the counties of Bessarabia
Shtetls
Jewish communities destroyed in the Holocaust